The Structure of the Egyptian Expeditionary Force over the course of the First World War is shown below.

1916
Canal Defences (General A. Murray)

No.1 Section, Headquarters Suez – IX Corps (January to March)

No.2 Section, Headquarters Ismailia – I Anzac Corps (January to March)
Imperial Service Cavalry Brigade
Jodhpur Lancers
Mysore Lancers
Hyderabad Lancers
11th Light Horse Regiment
12th Light Horse Regiment

(incomplete)

No.3 Section, Headquarters Port Said – (Major General H.A. Lawrence)
42nd (East Lancashire) Division
125th (Lancashire Fusiliers) Brigade
126th (East Lancashire) Brigade
127th (Manchester) Brigade
52nd (Lowland) Division (Major General W.E.B. Smith)
155th (South Scottish) Brigade
156th (Scottish Rifles) Brigade
157th (Highland Light Infantry) Brigade
Australian and New Zealand Mounted Division (Anzac Mounted Division) (Major General Sir H.G. Chauvel)
1st Australian Light Horse Brigade
1st Light Horse Regiment
2nd Light Horse Regiment
3rd Light Horse Regiment
Leicestershire Royal Horse Artillery
2nd Australian Light Horse Brigade
5th Light Horse Regiment
6th Light Horse Regiment
7th Light Horse Regiment
Ayrshire Royal Horse Artillery

3rd Australian Light Horse Brigade
8th Light Horse Regiment
9th Light Horse Regiment
10th Light Horse Regiment
Inverness-shire Royal Horse Artillery

New Zealand Mounted Rifles Brigade (Brigadier General Edward Chaytor)
Auckland Mounted Rifles Regiment (Lieutenant Colonel Charles Mackesy)
Canterbury Mounted Rifles Regiment (Lieutenant Colonel John Findlay)
Wellington Mounted Rifles Regiment (Lieutenant Colonel William Meldrum)
Somerset Royal Horse Artillery

5th Mounted Brigade (Brigadier General E. A. Wiggin)
Royal Gloucestershire Hussars
Warwickshire Yeomanry
Worcestershire Yeomanry

Imperial Camel Corps Brigade (Brigadier General C. L. Smith VC)
1st (Australian) Battalion
2nd (British) Battalion
3rd (Australian) Battalion
4th (ANZAC) Battalion

No. 1 Squadron, Australian Flying Corps (Lieutenant Colonel E. H. Reynold)
A Flight (Captain W. Sheldon – four machines later expanded to six)
B Flight (Lieutenant Manwell – four machines later expanded to six)
C Flight (Captain Williams  – four machines later expanded to six)

Until almost the end of 1917, No. l Squadron, A.F.C., and No. 14 Squadron, R.F.C., were the sole flying units east of the Suez Canal.

General organisation in April 1916
General Headquarters
General Headquarters Troops
No. 1 Section (IX Corps)
No. 2 Section (II ANZAC)
No. 3 Section (Anzac Mounted Division)
Western Frontier Force
Northwestern Section
Southwestern Section
L. of C. Defence Troops
Inspector-General of Communications
Alexandria District
Cyprus Garrison
Lines of Communication Units

Order of battle April
General Headquarters
 Commander in Chief – Lieutenant General (temp. General) A. J. Murray
 Chief of General Staff – Major General A. L. Lynden-Bell

Headquarters of Administrative services and departments
Army Signals, Work, Supplies and Transport, Railways, Ordnance, Remounts, Veterinary Services, Medical Services, Army Postal Services, Paymaster
Inspector General of Communication and Levant Base

Anzac Mounted Division GOC Colonel (temp. Major General) H.G. Chauvel
1st Light Horse Brigade (Western Force) GOC Lieutenant Colonel C. F. Cox (acting)
1st Light Horse Regiment
2nd Light Horse Regiment
3rd Light Horse Regiment
4th Light Horse Regiment (attached)
2nd Light Horse Brigade GOC Colonel (temp. Brigadier General G. de L. Ryrie)
5th Light Horse Regiment
6th Light Horse Regiment
7th Light Horse Regiment
12th Light Horse Regiment (attached)
3rd Light Horse Brigade GOC Brevet Lieutenant Colonel (temp. Brigadier General) J. M Antill
8th Light Horse Regiment
9th Light Horse Regiment
10th  Light Horse Regiment
11th Light Horse Regiment (attached)
New Zealand Mounted Rifles Brigade GOC Brigadier General E. W. C. Chaytor)
Auckland Mounted Rifle Regiment
Canterbury Mounted Rifle Regiment
Wellington Mounted Rifle Regiment
Otago Mounted Rifles Regiment (attached)
Divisional Troops
Artillery
III Brigade, Royal Horse Artillery (T.F.) Leicestershire and Somerset Batteries
IV Brigade, Royal Horse Artillery (T.F.) Inverness-shire and Ayrshire Batteries
Engineers
1st Australian Field Squadron
Signal Service
1st Anzac Signal Squadron
Army Service Corps (ASC)
HQ, Light Horse Divisional ASC
Light Horse Supply Column (M.T.)
Medical Units
1st, 2nd and 3rd Light Horse Field Ambulances
NZ Mounted Brigade Ambulance

IX Corps
GOC Major General (temp. Lieutenant General) F. J. Davies
Corps Troops
Mounted Troops
8th Mounted Brigade
1/1st City of London Yeomanry
1/1st County of London Yeomanry
1/3rd County of London Yeomanry
1/1st London Signal Troop
"B" Battery, Honourable Artillery Company (H.A.C.)
No. 9 Field Troop
1/1st London Mounted Brigade Field Ambulance
Signal Service
HH and KK Cable Section
London Pack Wireless Section
Northern Wagon Wireless Section

42nd (East Lancashire) Division
GOC Major General W. Douglas
125th (Lancashire Fusiliers) Brigade GOC Colonel (temp. Brigadier General) H. C. Frith
1/5th Lancashire Fusiliers
1/6th Lancashire Fusiliers
1/7th Lancashire Fusiliers
1/8th Lancashire Fusiliers
125th Brigade Machine Gun Company
126th (East Lancashire) Brigade GOC Major (temp. Brigadier General) A. W. Tufnell
1/4th East Lancashire Regiment
1/5th East Lancashire Regiment
1/9th Manchester Regiment
1/10th Manchester Regiment
126th Brigade Machine Gun Company
127th (Manchester) Brigade GOC Lieutenant Colonel (temp. Brigadier General) V. A. Ormsby
1/5th Manchester Regiment
1/6th Manchester Regiment
1/7th Manchester Regiment
1/8th Manchester Regiment
127th Brigade Machine Gun Company
Divisional Troops
Mounted Troops
1 Squadron Duke of Lancaster's Own Yeomanry
13th Cyclist Company
Artillery
1/1st East Lancashire Brigade RFA
1/2nd East Lancashire Brigade RFA
1/3rd East Lancashire Brigade RFA
1/4th East Lancashire (Howitzer) Brigade RFA
42nd Divisional Ammunition Column
Engineers
1/1st East Lancashire Field Company RE
1/2nd East Lancashire Field Company RE
1/2nd West Lancashire Field Company RE
Signal Service
42nd Divisional Signal Company
ASC
42nd Divisional Train
Medical Units
1/1st, 1/2nd and 1/3rd East Lancashire Field Ambulances

3rd Dismounted Brigade (attached)
GOC Lieutenant Colonel Lord Kensington (Acting)
1/1st Royal East Kent Yeomanry
1/1st Queen's Own West Kent Yeomanry
1/1st Sussex Yeomanry
1/1st Welsh Horse
1/1st Norfolk Yeomanry
1/1st Suffolk Yeomanry
Machine Gun Company
3rd Dismounted Brigade Signal Troop
1/1st Eastern and 1/1st South Eastern Mounted Brigade Field Ambulances

54th (East Anglian) Division
GOC Colonel (temp. Major General) S. W. Hare
161st (Essex) Brigade
1/4th Essex Regiment
1/5th Essex Regiment
1/6th Essex Regiment
1/7th Essex Regiment
161st Machine Gun Company
162nd (East Midland) Brigade
1/5th Bedfordshire Regiment
1/4th Northamptonshire Regiment
1/10th London Regiment
1/11th London Regiment
162nd Machine Gun Company
163rd (Norfolk and Suffolk) Brigade
1/4th Norfolk Regiment
1/5th Norfolk Regiment
1/8th Hampshire Regiment
163rd Machine Gun Company
Divisional Troops
Mounted Troops
1 Squadron 1/1st Hertfordshire Yeomanry (with HQ and Machine Gun Section)
Artillery
1/1st East Anglian Brigade RFA
1/2nd East Anglian Brigade RFA
1/3rd East Anglian Brigade RFA
1/4th East Anglian Brigade RFA
54th Divisional Ammunition Column (one officer and 35 other ranks)
Engineers
2/1st East Anglian Field Company RE
1/2nd East Anglian Field Company RE
1/1st Kent Field Company RE
Signal Service
54th Divisional Signal Company
ASC
54th Divisional Train (Supply details only)
Medical Units
2/1st, 1/2nd and 1/3rd East Anglian Field Ambulances

20th Indian Brigade (attached)
GOC Brigadier General H. D. Watson
2/3rd Gurkhas
58th Rifles
Alwar Infantry (I.S.)
Gwalior Infantry (I.S.)

29th Indian Brigade
GOC Colonel (temp. Brigadier General) P. C. Palin
23rd Pioneers
57th Rifles
Patiala Infantry (I.S.)
No. 10 Co. King's Own Sappers and Miners
110, 121, 135 Indian Field Ambulances
7th and 26th Mule Corps

II Australian and New Zealand Army Corps (II ANZAC)
GOC Major General (temp. LIeutenant General) A. J. Godley
Corps Troops
Signal Service
No. 24 Airline Section
FF and NN Cable Sections
1st Australian Ammunition Park
1st Australian Supply Column
Royal Australian Navy Bridging Train
14th Fortress Company RE

4th Australian Division
GOC Major General H. V. Cox
4th Australian Infantry Brigade
GOC Colonel (temp. Brigadier General) J. Monash
13th Battalion
14th Battalion
15th Battalion
16th Battalion
4th Machine Gun Company
12th Australian Infantry Brigade
45th Battalion
46th Battalion
47th Battalion
48th Battalion
12th Machine Gun Company
13th Australian Infantry Brigade
49th Battalion
50th Battalion
51st Battalion
52nd Battalion
13th Machine Gun Company
Divisional Troops
Mounted Troops
"B" Squadron 13th Light Horse Regiment
4th Divisional Cyclist Company
Artillery
X Field Artillery Brigade
XI Field Artillery Brigade
XII Field Artillery Brigade
XXIV Howitzer Brigade
4th Divisional Ammunition Column
Engineers
4th Field Company
12th Field Company
13th Field Company
Signal Service
4th Divisional Signal Company
Pioneers
4th Pioneer Battalion
ASC
7th, 14th, 26th and 27th Coys, AASC
Medical Units
4th, 12th, 13th Field Ambulances

5th Australian Division
GOC Colonel (temp Major General) J. W. McCay
8th Australian Infantry Brigade
29th Battalion
30th Battalion
31st Battalion
32nd Battalion
8th Machine Gun Company
14th Australian Infantry Brigade
53rd Battalion
54th Battalion
55th Battalion
56th Battalion
14th Machine Gun Company
15th Australian Infantry Brigade
57th Battalion
58th Battalion
59th Battalion
60th Battalion
15th Machine Gun Company
Divisional Troops
Mounted Troops
"C" Squadron 13th Light Horse Regiment
5th Divisional Cyclist Company
Artillery
XIII Field Artillery Brigade
XIV Field Artillery Brigade
XV Field Artillery Brigade
XXV Howitzer Brigade
5th Divisional Ammunition Column
Engineers
8th Field Company
14th Field Company
15th Field Company
Signal Service
5th Divisional Signal Company
Pioneers
5th Pioneer Battalion
ASC
10th, 18th, 28th and 29th Coys, AASC
Medical Units
8th, 14th, 15th Field Ambulances

11th (Northern) Division
GOC Major General E. A. Fanshawe
32nd Brigade
9th West Yorkshire Regiment
6th Yorkshire Regiment
8th West Riding Regiment
6th York and Lancaster Regiment
32nd Brigade Machine Gun Company
33rd Brigade
6th Lincolnshire Regiment
6th Border Regiment
7th South Staffordshire Regiment
9th Sherwood Foresters
33rd Brigade Machine Gun Company
34th Brigade
8th Northumberland Fusiliers
9th Lancashire Fusiliers
5th Dorsetshire Regiment
11th Manchester Regiment
34th Brigade Machine Gun Company
Divisional Troops
Mounted Troops
1 Squadron 1/1st Hertfordshire Yeomanry
11th Cyclist Company
Artillery
LVIII Brigade RFA
LIX Brigade RFA
LX Brigade RFA
CXXXIII Brigade RFA
Engineers
67th Field Company RE
68th Field Company RE
86th Field Company RE
Signal Service
11th Divisional Signal Company
Pioneers
6th East Yorkshire Regiment
ASC
11th Divisional Train (Supply details only)
Medical Units
33rd, 34th, 35th Field Ambulances

No. 3 Section Canal Defences
GOC etc Headquarters 52nd Division
Corps Troops
Mounted Troops
5th Mounted Brigade
1/1st Warwick Yeomanry
1/1st Gloucester Yeomanry
1/1st Worcester Yeomanry
1/1st South Midland Signal Troop
"A" Battery, H.A.C.
No. 7 Field Troop
1/1st South Midland Mounted Brigade Field Ambulance
Engineers
220th Army Troops Company RE
Signal Service
No. 21 Airline Section
WW Cable Section

52nd (Lowland) Division
GOC Major General H. A. Lawrence
155th (South Scottish) Brigade
1/4th Royal Scots Fusiliers
1/5th Royal Scots Fusiliers
1/4th King's Own Scottish Borderers
1/5th King's Own Scottish Borderers
155th Brigade Machine Gun Company
156th (Scottish Rifles) Brigade
1/4th (Queen's Edinburgh Rifles) Royal Scots
1/7th Royal Scots
1/7th Scottish Rifles
1/8th Scottish Rifles
156th Brigade Machine Gun Company
157th (Highland Light Infantry) Brigade
1/5th Highland Light Infantry
1/6th Highland Light Infantry
1/7th (Blythswood) Bn, Highland Light Infantry
1/5th Argyll and Sutherland Highlanders
157th Brigade Machine Gun Company
Divisional Troops
Mounted Troops
HQ and "C" Squadron Royal Glasgow Yeomanry
52nd Cyclist Company
Artillery
1/2nd Lowland Brigade RFA
1/3rd Lowland Brigade RFA
1/4th Lowland Brigade RFA
1/5th Lowland Brigade RFA
52nd Divisional Ammunition Column (one officer and 35 other ranks)
Engineers
2/1st Lowland Field Company RE
2/2nd Lowland Field Company RE
1/2nd Lowland Field Company RE
Signal Service
52nd Divisional Signal Company
ASC
52nd Divisional Train
Medical Units
1/1st, 1/2nd and 1/3rd Lowland Field Ambulances

1st Dismounted Brigade (attached)
GOC Temp Brigadier General Marquess of Tullibardine
1/1st Scottish Horse
1/2nd Scottish Horse
1/3rd Scottish Horse
1/1st Ayr Yeomanry
1/1st Lanark Yeomanry
Machine Gun Company
1st Dismounted Brigade Signal Troop
1/1st Scottish and 1/1st Lowland Mounted Brigade Field Ambulances

Western Frontier Force
GOC Major General W. E. Peyton
Force Troops
Mounted Troops
6th Mounted Brigade
1/1st Buckinghamshire Yeomanry
1/1st Berkshire Yeomanry
1/1st Dorsetshire Yeomanry
1/2nd South Midland Field Troop Signal [sic]
No. 6 Field Troop
1/2nd South Midland Mounted Brigade Field Ambulance
1/2nd County of London Yeomanry (attached)
Royal Flying Corps
No. 17 Squadron
Artillery
1/1st Berkshire Battery RHA
1/1st Nottinghamshire Battery RHA
Infantry
1st Battalion British West Indies Regiment
2nd Battalion British West Indies Regiment
3rd Battalion British West Indies Regiment
Signal Service
2nd Mounted Divisional Signal Squadron
No. 42 Airline Section
UU Cable Section
No. 6 Pack Wireless Section

North Western Section
GOC etc Headquarters 53rd Division

53rd (Welsh) Division
GOC Colonel (temp. Major General) A. G. Dallas
158th (North Wales) Brigade
1/5th Royal Welch Fusiliers
1/6th Royal Welch Fusiliers
1/7th Royal Welch Fusiliers
1/1st Herefordshire Regiment
158th Brigade Machine Gun Company
159th (Cheshire) Brigade
1/4th Cheshire Regiment
1/7th Cheshire Regiment
1/4th Welch Regiment
1/5th Welch Regiment
159th Brigade Machine Gun Company
160th (Welsh Border) Brigade
1/4th Royal Sussex Regiment
2/4th Royal West Surrey Regiment
2/4th Royal West Kent Regiment
2/10th Middlesex Regiment
160th Brigade Machine Gun Company
Divisional Troops
Mounted Troops
1 Squadron 1/1st Hertfordshire Yeomanry
53rd Divisional Cyclist Company
Artillery
1/1st Cheshire Brigade RFA
1/1st Welsh Brigade RFA
1/2nd Welsh Brigade RFA
1/4th Welsh Brigade RFA
53rd Divisional Ammunition Column (one officer and 35 other ranks)
Engineers
1/1st Welsh Field Company RE
2/1st Welsh Field Company RE
2/1st Cheshire Field Company RE
Signal Service
53rd Divisional Signal Company
ASC
53rd Divisional Train
Medical Units
1/1st, 1/2nd and 1/3rd Welsh Field Ambulances

4th Dismounted Brigade (attached)
GOC Temp Brigadier General John Stewart-Murray, Marquess of Tullibardine
1/1st Shropshire Yeomanry
1/1st Denbighshire Yeomanry
1/1st Cheshire Yeomanry
1/1st Glamorgan Yeomanry
1/1st Montgomeryshire Yeomanry
1/1st Pembrokeshire Yeomanry
Machine Gun Company
4th Dismounted Brigade Signal Troop
1/1st Welsh Border and 1/1st South Wales Mounted Brigade Field Ambulances

22nd Mounted Brigade
1/1st Lincolnshire Yeomanry
1/1st Staffordshire Yeomanry
1/1st East Riding Yeomanry
Signal Troop
Mounted Brigade, ASC
Mounted Brigade Field Ambulance

Provisional Infantry Brigade (less Headquarters)
1/6th Royal Scots
2/5th Devonshire Regiment
2/7th Middlesex Regiment
2/8th Middlesex Regiment
2nd Garrison battalion, Liverpool Regiment
2 Naval 4-inch guns
1/2nd Kent Field Company RE
17th Motor Machine Gun Battery
No. 1 Armoured Train

South Western Section
GOC Colonel (temp Brigadier General) H. W. Hodgson
Mounted Troops
1st Australian Light Horse Brigade (see above)
1 squadron Egyptian Army Cavalry
Infantry
2nd Garrison Battalion Cheshire Regiment
1 Company and Machine Gun Section Egyptian Army
Signal Service
Detachment 2nd Mounted Divisional Signal Squadron
Emergency Squadron, Royal Naval Armoured Car Division
H.Q. and Nos. 1, 2, 3 Light Armoured Motor Batteries
No. 2 Armoured Train

General Headquarters Troops
Mounted Troops
Imperial Camel Corps
Birkanir Camel Corps
Royal Flying Corps
5th Wing Royal Flying Corps
No. 14 Squadron RFC
No. 17 Squadron RFC (with Western Force)
2 Kite Balloon Sections (Naval)

Artillery
Heavy Artillery
XX Brigade Royal Garrison Artillery (RGA)
10th, 15th 91st Heavy Batteries RGA
1 Heavy Battery and 1 Section Heavy Battery, Royal Marine Artillery
Stokes Gun Batteries
125th, 126th, 161st, 162nd Brigade Batteries
Anti-Aircraft Artillery
Nos. 30 and 38 Anti-Aircraft Sections
Mountain Artillery
4th Highland (Mountain) Brigade RGA (Argyllshire and Ross & Cromarty Batteries)
Armoured Cars
Nos 11 and 12 Armoured Motor Batteries

Engineers
11th, 116, 276th Railway Companies RE

Signal Service
GHQ Signal Company
Nos 14 and 15 Airline Sections,
NA, NB and VV Cable Sections
Unallotted
Southern Motor, W/T Station
No. 5 Pack Wireless Section

ASC
338th, 493rd, 619th Mechanical Transport Companies ASC

Transport
Camel Transport Corps
59th, 62nd, 70th, 191st Camel Corps

Lines of Communication Defence Troops
Mounted Troops
Imperial Service Cavalry Brigade
Mysore Lancers
1st Hyderabad Lancers
Kathiwar Signal Troop
124th Indian Cavalry Field Ambulance
Infantry
1st Garrison Battalion, Essex Regiment
2nd Garrison Battalion, Royal Welch Fusiliers
1st Garrison Battalion, Devonshire Regiment
1st Garrison Battalion, Royal Scots (less two companies)
1st Garrison Battalion, Liverpool Regiment
1st Garrison Battalion, Royal Irish Regiment
19th Garrison Battalion, Rifle Brigade
20th Garrison Battalion, Rifle Brigade
21st Garrison Battalion, Rifle Brigade
22nd Garrison Battalion, Rifle Brigade
1st Garrison Battalion, Royal Warwickshire Regiment (Khartoum)

Alexandria District
Coast Defence Artillery
84th Siege Battery RGA
92nd Company RGA, Mex Battery
Ras el Tin Battery
Silsileh Battery
"Y" Battery Royal Malta Artillery

and Lines of Communications units of Infantry, Signal Service, Engineers, ASC, Medical Units, Ordnance Units, Veterinary Units and Postal Units.

Distribution, 27 July
Eastern Frontier
No. 1 Section
8th Mounted Brigade
54th (East Anglian) Division (less 163rd Brigade)
20th Indian Brigade
29th Indian Brigade

No. 2 Section
3rd Light Horse Brigade
160th (Welsh Border) Brigade (53rd Division)
163rd (Norfolk and Suffolk) Brigade (54th Division)
British West Indies Brigade

No. 2a Section
42nd (East Lancashire) Division

No. 3 Section
Anzac Mounted Division
5th Mounted Brigade
52nd (Lowland) Division
158th Brigade (53rd Division)
1st Dismounted Brigade

Western Frontier
6th Mounted Brigade
22nd Mounted Brigade
Part 53rd Division
2nd Dismounted Brigade
4th Dismounted Brigade

No. 3 Section Canal Defences August

Canal Defences No. 3 Section Headquarters Kantara (included Romani) (Major General H.A. Lawrence)

Force Defending Romani on 4 August
52nd (Lowland) Division (Major General W.E.B. Smith)
155th (South Scottish) Brigade
156th (Scottish Rifles) Brigade
157th (Highland Light Infantry) Brigade
Anzac Mounted Division (Major General Sir H.G. Chauvel)
1st Australian Light Horse Brigade (Brigadier General J. B. H. Meredith)
1st Light Horse Regiment
2nd Light Horse Regiment
3rd Light Horse Regiment
2nd Australian Light Horse Brigade (Brigadier General J. R. Royston)
Wellington Mounted Rifle Regiment (Lieutenant Colonel W. Meldrum) detached from New Zealand Mounted Rifles Brigade
6th Light Horse Regiment
7th Light Horse Regiment
(5th Light Horse Regiment at Duidar)
Force moved to Romani during 4 August and took part in the battle
5th Mounted Brigade (Brigadier General E.A. Wiggin)
Gloucestershire Hussars
Warwickshire Yeomanry
Worcestershire Yeomanry
New Zealand Mounted Rifles Brigade (Brigadier General E. W. C. Chaytor)
Auckland Mounted Rifle Regiment (Lieutenant Colonel C. E. R. Mackesy)
Canterbury Mounted Rifle Regiment (Lieutenant Colonel J. Findlay)

Force moved to Romani during 4 August and took part in the battle on 5 August
42nd (East Lancashire) Division
125th (Lancashire Fusiliers) Brigade
126th (East Lancashire) Brigade
127th (Manchester) Brigade

3rd Australian Light Horse Brigade
8th Light Horse Regiment
9th Light Horse Regiment
10th Light Horse Regiment

Eastern Frontier Force
October 1916
Eastern Frontier Force, also known as Eastern Force, was formed in Cairo on 18 October 1916 with headquarters at Ismailia. The force was commanded by Lieutenant General Charles Dobell, who had commanded Western Frontier Force.
Eastern Force consisted of

52nd (Lowland) Division
155th (South Scottish) Brigade
156th (Scottish Rifles) Brigade
157th (Highland Light Infantry) Brigade
53rd (Welsh) Division
158th (North Wales) Brigade
159th (Cheshire) Brigade
160th (Welsh Border) Brigade

54th (East Anglian) Division
161st (Essex) Brigade
162nd (East Midland) Brigade
163rd (Norfolk and Suffolk) Brigade

Anzac Mounted Division
1st Australian Light Horse Brigade
1st Light Horse Regiment
2nd Light Horse Regiment
3rd Light Horse Regiment
4th Light Horse Regiment (attached)
2nd Australian Light Horse Brigade
5th Light Horse Regiment
6th Light Horse Regiment
7th Light Horse Regiment
12th Light Horse Regiment (attached)
3rd Australian Light Horse Brigade (commander Brevet Lieutenant Colonel J. M. Antill)
8th Light Horse Regiment
9th Light Horse Regiment
10th Light Horse Regiment
11th Light Horse Regiment (attached)
New Zealand Mounted Rifles Brigade
Auckland Mounted Rifles Regiment
Canterbury Mounted Rifles Regiment
Wellington Mounted Rifles Regiment
Otago Mounted Rifles Regiment (less one squadron attached)
4 Territorial Royal Horse Artillery Batteries 2 Scottish and 2 English (Ayrshire, Inverness-shire, Somerset and Leicestershire Batteries)
5th Mounted Brigade
Gloucestershire Hussars
Warwickshire Yeomanry
Worcestershire Yeomanry
Imperial Camel Corps Brigade
2 Light Car Patrols
No. 1 Squadron, Australian Flying Corps

Western Frontier Force

October 1916 to February 1917
Western Desert Force (Major General William Watson)
Egyptian Army troops Darfur
Sollum Recapture (Major General W. E. Peyton)
Siwa Raid (General H. W. Hodgson)
1st Light Horse Brigade
Imperial Camel Corps
Bikanir Camel Corps
Armoured Car Brigade (11 Rolls–Royces)
6 Light Car Patrols (Model T Fords armed with Lewis guns)

Order of battle 23 December

Anzac Mounted Division (Major General Chauvel)
1st Light Horse Brigade
1st Light Horse Regiment
2nd Light Horse Regiment
3rd Light Horse Regiment
3rd Light Horse Brigade
8th Light Horse Regiment
9th Light Horse Regiment
10th Light Horse Regiment
New Zealand Mounted Rifles Brigade (Brigadier General E. W. C. Chaytor)
Auckland Mounted Rifle Regiment (Lieutenant Colonel C. E. R. Mackesy)
Canterbury Mounted Rifle Regiment (Lieutenant Colonel J. Findlay)
Wellington Mounted Rifle Regiment (Lieutenant Colonel W. Meldrum)
Imperial Camel Corps Brigade
Hong Kong & Singapore Mountain Battery,
Inverness-shire and Somerset Batteries Royal Horse Artillery
No. 1 Squadron Australian Flying Corps
No. 14 Squadron Royal Flying Corps

Desert Column December
Desert Column Headquarters El Arish (Lieutenant General Sir Philip Chetwode)
42nd (East Lancashire) Division
125th (Lancashire Fusiliers) Brigade
126th (East Lancashire) Brigade
127th (Manchester) Brigade
52nd (Lowland) Division (Major General W. E. B. Smith)
155th (South Scottish) Brigade
156th (Scottish Rifles) Brigade
157th (Highland Light Infantry) Brigade
Anzac Mounted Division (Major General H. G. Chauvel)
1st Light Horse Brigade
2nd Light Horse Brigade
3rd Light Horse Brigade
New Zealand Mounted Rifles Brigade
Imperial Camel Corps Brigade

Royal Flying Corps 5th Wing stationed at Mustabig (Lieutenant Colonel W. G. H. Salmond)
No. 14 (British) Squadron
(No. 17 Squadron)
No. 1 Squadron Australian Flying Corps / No. 67 (Australian) Squadron

1917
Royal Flying Corps in Egypt in January 1917
Headquarters Middle East Brigade
5th Wing
No. 14 Squadron Royal Flying Corps
No. 67 Squadron Royal Flying Corps
20th Reserve Wing
Nos. 21, 22, 23, 57 and 58 Reserve Squadrons
No. 3 School of Military Aeronautics.

By January 1917 there were three smaller commands directly under GHQ EEF.

Western Force
Bikanir Camel Corps
230th Brigade
231st Brigade
Detachments R.A., dismounted (seven 15-pdr. guns, two 9-pdr. Krupp guns, two Naval 4-in. guns)
5 Armoured Motor Batteries
6 Light Car Patrols (Ford)
Motor Machine Gun Battery
1 Garrison Battalion

Alexandria District
103rd Local Company RGA
5th Battalion British West Indies Regiment

2 Garrison Battalions

Delta District
2nd Battalion North Lancs Regiment (from East Africa)
1/4th Battalion Duke of Cornwall's Light Infantry (from Aden)
5 Garrison Battalions

With the front line approaching Gaza, the defence of the Suez Canal was still part of Eastern Force but had been reduced to:

Northern Section Suez Canal
20th Indian Brigade
1st Battalion British West Indies Regiment
2nd Battalion British West Indies Regiment
3 Garrison Battalions

Southern Section Suez Canal
Imperial Service Cavalry Brigade
2 Companies Imperial Camel Corps
267th Brigade RFA (53rd Division)
272nd Brigade RFA (54th Division)
229th Brigade (to form part of the 74th Division).

Order of Battle 9 January

Desert Column (Lieutenant General Philip Chetwode)
Anzac Mounted Division (Major General Harry Chauvel)
1st Light Horse Brigade (Brigadier General Charles Frederick Cox)
3rd Light Horse Brigade (Brigadier General John Royston)
New Zealand Mounted Rifles Brigade (Brigadier General Edward Chaytor)
Inverness-shire, Leicestershire and Somerset Territorial Royal Horse Artillery batteries
Imperial Camel Corps Brigade
1st (Australian) Battalion
2nd (British) Battalion
3rd (Australian) Battalion
4th (Australian and New Zealand) Battalion
Hong Kong and Singapore Mountain Battery
5th Mounted Brigade
Honourable Artillery Company (18–pounder) Battery
No. 7 Light Car Patrol (six Ford cars equipped with machine guns)
No. 1 Squadron Australian Flying Corps
No. 14 Squadron Royal Flying Corps

Order of Battle March

Eastern Force (Lieutenant General Sir C. M. Dobell)
Imperial Camel Corps Brigade (Brigadier General S. Smith)
1st (Australian) Battalion
2nd (British) Battalion
3rd (Australian) Battalion
4th (Anzac) Battalion

52nd (Lowland) Division (Major General W. E. B. Smith)
155th (South Scottish) Brigade
1/4th Battalion, Royal Scots Fusiliers
1/5th Battalion, Royal Scots Fusiliers
1/4th Battalion, King's Own Scottish Borderers
1/5th Battalion, King's Own Scottish Borderers
156th (Scottish Rifles) Brigade
1/7th Battalion, Cameronians (Scottish Rifles)
1/8th Battalion, Cameronians (Scottish Rifles)
1/4th Battalion, Royal Scots
1/7th Battalion, Royal Scots
157th (Highland Light Infantry) Brigade
1/5th Battalion, Highland Light Infantry
1/6th Battalion, Highland Light Infantry
1/7th Battalion, Highland Light Infantry
1/5th Battalion, Argyll and Sutherland Highlanders

54th (East Anglian) Division (Major General S. W. Hare)
161st (Essex) Brigade
1/4th Battalion, Essex Regiment
1/5th Battalion, Essex Regiment
1/6th Battalion, Essex Regiment
1/7th Battalion, Essex Regiment
162nd (East Midland) Brigade
1/5th Battalion, Bedfordshire Regiment
1/4th Battalion, Northamptonshire Regiment
1/10th Battalion, London Regiment (Hackney)
1/11th Battalion, London Regiment (Finsbury Rifles)
163rd (Norfolk and Suffolk) Brigade
1/4th Battalion, Norfolk Regiment
1/5th Battalion, Norfolk Regiment
1/5th Battalion, Suffolk Regiment
1/8th Battalion, Hampshire Regiment

74th (Yeomanry) Division (Major General E. S. Girdwood)
229th Brigade
16th Battalion, Devonshire Regiment
12th Battalion, Somerset Light Infantry
12th Battalion, Royal Scots Fusiliers
14th Battalion, Black Watch (Royal Highland Regiment)
No. 7 Light Car Patrol
Nos. 11 and 12 Armoured Motor Batteries
5th Wing Royal Flying Corps
No. 1 Squadron Australian Flying Corps
No. 14 Squadron Royal Flying Corps

Desert Column (Lieutenant General P. Chetwode)
53rd (Welsh) Division (Major General A. G. Dallas)
158th (North Wales) Brigade (Brigadier General H. A. Vernon)
1/5th Battalion, Royal Welsh Fusiliers
1/6th Battalion, Royal Welsh Fusiliers
1/7th Battalion, Royal Welsh Fusiliers
1/1st Battalion, Herefordshire Regiment
158th Brigade Machine Gun Company
159th (Cheshire) Brigade (Brigadier General N. Money)
1/4th Battalion, Cheshire Regiment
1/7th Battalion, Cheshire Regiment
1/4th Battalion, Welch Regiment
1/5th Battalion Welch Regiment
159th Brigade Machine Gun Company
160th (Welsh Border) Brigade  (Brigadier General V. L. N. Pearson)
2/4th Battalion Royal West Surrey Regiment
1/4th Battalion, Royal Sussex Regiment
2/4th Battalion, Royal West Kent Regiment
2/10th Battalion, Middlesex Regiment
160th Brigade Machine Gun Company  Anzac Mounted Division (Major General H. G. Chauvel)
2nd Light Horse Brigade (Brigadier General Granville Ryrie)
5th Light Horse Regiment
6th Light Horse Regiment
7th Light Horse Regiment
New Zealand Mounted Rifles Brigade (Brigadier General Edward Chaytor)
Auckland Mounted Rifle Regiment
Canterbury Mounted Rifle Regiment
Wellington Mounted Rifle Regiment
22nd Mounted Yeomanry Brigade (Brigadier General Fryer)
1/1st Lincolnshire Yeomanry
1/1st Staffordshire Yeomanry
1/1st East Riding Yeomanry

Imperial Mounted Division (less 4th Light Horse Brigade) (Major General Henry West Hodgson)
3rd Light Horse Brigade (Brigadier General Royston/L. C. Wilson)
8th Light Horse Regiment
9th Light Horse Regiment
10th Light Horse Regiment
5th Mounted Brigade (Brigadier General Percy Desmond FitzGerald)
Royal Gloucestershire Hussars
Warwickshire Yeomanry
Worcestershire Hussars
6th Mounted Yeomanry Brigade (Lieutenant Colonel (temp. Brigadier General) T. M. S. Pitt/Brigadier General C. A. C. Godwin)
Dorset Yeomanry
Berkshire Yeomanry
Royal Buckinghamshire Yeomanry

Artillery
 53rd (Welsh) Division (3 Brigades RFA 12 18–pdrs=24 guns) 4 of each battery only = 16 guns; 4 4.5-inch howitzers = 8 howitzer
 54th (East Anglian) Division (3 Brigades RFA 12 18–pdrs=24 guns) 4 of each battery only = 16 guns; 4 4.5-inch howitzers = 8 howitzer
 Anzac Mounted Division 4 Batteries RHA of 4 18–pdrs = 16 guns
 Imperial Mounted Division 4 Batteries RHA of 4 18–pdrs = 16 guns
 Imperial Camel Brigade 1 Camel Pack Battery of 6 2.75-inch = 6 guns
 Army Troops (3 Batteries of 4 60–pdrs=12 guns) one section only = 6 guns

Organization in April 1917
General Headquarters
General Headquarters Troops
Southern Canal Section
Cyprus Detachment
Eastern Force
Force Troops
Desert Column
Northern Canal Section
Delta and Western Force
Alexandria District

1st Garrison Battalion, Essex Regiment at Khartoum

Order of Battle April

General Headquarters
Commander in Chief Lieutenant General (temp. General) A. J. Murray

Eastern Force
GOC Major General (temp. Lieutenant General) C. M. Dobell
Brigadier General General Staff Brevet Lieutenant Colonel (temp. Brigadier General) G. P. Dawnay
Force Troops
Mounted Troops
Imperial Camel Brigade GOC Major (temp. Brigadier General) C. L. Smith
1st (Australian and New Zealand) Battalion
2nd (Imperial) Battalion
3rd (Australian and New Zealand) Battalion
Hong Kong and Singapore Camel Battery
Brigade Signal Section
Brigade Field Troop
Brigade Machine Gun Company
1/1st Scottish Horse Field Ambulance
Imperial Service Cavalry Brigade GOC Major (temp. Brigadier General) M. H. Henderson
Mysore Lancers
1st Hyderabad Lancers
Kathiwar Signal Troop
124th Indian Cavalry Field Ambulance
Artillery
XCVI Heavy Artillery Group (four 4-gun 60-pdr, one siege battery)
Nos. 30, 38, 55, 85, 96 Anti-Aircraft Sections
Machine Gune Corps
"E" Company, Heavy Section (Tanks)
Nos. 11 and 12 Light Armoured Car Batteries
17th Motor Machine Gun Battery
Nos. 1 and 3 Armoured Trains
Engineers
220th and 555th Army Troops Companies
No. 10 Company (Kings's Own) Sappers and Miners
1/23rd and 2/23rd Sikh Pioneers
360th Company, RE (water unit)
Signal Service
GHQ Signal Company
Pigeon Section
N 14, N 15, N 23, N 24, No. 61 Airline Sections
BR, NA, NB, NN Cable Sections
No. 9 Wagon and London Pack W/T Sections

52nd (Lowland) Division
GOC Brevet Colonel (temp. Major General) W. E. B. Smith
155th (South Scottish) Brigade
156th (Scottish Rifles) Brigade
157th (Highland Light Infantry) Brigade
Artillery
261st Brigade RFA
262nd Brigade RFA
263rd Brigade RFA (troops same as April 1916 oob less cyclist company)

53rd (Welsh) Division
GOC Major General S. F. Mott
158th (North Wales) Brigade
159th (Cheshire) Brigade
160th (Welsh Border) Brigade
Artillery
265th Brigade RFA
266th Brigade RFA
267th Brigade RFA
(troops same as April 1916 oob)

54th (East Anglian) Division
GOC Colonel (temp. Major General) S. W. Hare
161st (Essex) Brigade
162nd (East Midland) Brigade
163rd (Norfolk and Suffolk) Brigade
Artillery
270th Brigade RFA
271st Brigade RFA
272nd Brigade RFA
(troops same as April 1916 oob)

74th (Yeomanry) Division
GOC Brevet Lieutenant Colonel (temp. Major General) E. S. Girdwood
229th Brigade
16th (R. 1st Devon and R. N. Devon Yeo Bn) Devonshire Regiment
12th (W. Somerset Yeo. Bn) Somerset Light Infantry
14th (Fife and Forfar Yeo. Bn) Royal Highlanders
12th (Ayr and Lanark Yeo Bn) Royal Scots Fusiliers
4th Machine Gun Company
230th Brigade
10th (Royal East Kent and West Kent Yeomanry) Battalion, Buffs (Royal East Kent Regiment)
16th (Sussex Yeomanry) Battalion, Royal Sussex Regiment
15th (Suffolk Yeomanry) Battalion, Suffolk Regiment
12th (Norfolk Yeomanry) Battalion, Norfolk Regiment
209th Machine Gun Company
231st Brigade
10th (Shrop. and Chester Yeomanry) Battalion, Shropshire Light Infantry
24th (Denbigh Yeomanry) Battalion, Royal Welch Fusiliers
24th (Pembroke and Glamorgan Yeomanry) Battalion, Welch Regiment
25th (Montgomery and Welsh Horse Yeomanry) Battalion, Royal Welch Fusiliers
210th Machine Gun Company
Divisional Troops
Mounted Troops
1 Squadron 1/2nd County of London Yeomanry
Engineers
5th Royal Monmouth Field Company RE
5th Royal Anglesey Field Company RE
Signal Service
74th Divisional Signal Company
ASC
74th Divisional Train
Medical Units
229th, 230th, 231st Field Ambulances

Desert Column
GOC Major General (temp. Lieutenant General) P. W. Chetwode
Anzac Mounted Division GOC Colonel (temp. Major General) H. G. Chauvel
1st Australian Light Horse Brigade [Anzac Mounted Division] GOC Lieutenant Colonel C. F. Cox
1st Light Horse Regiment
2nd Light Horse Regiment
3rd Light Horse Regiment
1st Australian Light Horse Signal Troop
1st Australian Machine Gun Squadron
2nd Australian Light Horse Brigade GOC Colonel (temp. Brigadier General) G. de L. Ryrie
5th Light Horse Regiment
6th Light Horse Regiment
7th Light Horse Regiment
2nd Australian Light Horse Signal Troop
2nd Australian Machine Gun Squadron
New Zealand Mounted Rifles Brigade GOC Brigadier General E. W. C. Chaytor
Auckland Mounted Rifle Regiment
Canterbury Mounted Rifle Regiment
Wellington Mounted Rifle Regiment
New Zealand Mounted Rifles Signal Troop
New Zealand Machine Gun Squadron
22nd Mounted Brigade GOC Colonel (temp. Brigadier General) F. A. B. Fryer
1/1st Lincolnshire Yeomanry
1/1st Staffordshire Yeomanry
1/1st East Riding Yeomanry
22nd Mounted Brigade Signal Troop
18th Machine Gun Squadron
Divisional Troops
Artillery
III (T.F.) Brigade RHA  Leicester and Somerset Batteries
IV (T.F.) Brigade RHA Inverness-shire and Ayrshire Batteries – no longer brigaded
Mounted Divisional Ammunition Column
Engineers
1st Australian Field Squadron
Signal Service
1st Anzac Signal Squadron
Army Service Corps (ASC)
HQ, Light Horse Divisional ASC
Nos 26 and 27 Australian Units of Supply
Medical Units
1st, 2nd Light Horse and the 1/1st North Midland Mounted Brigade Field Ambulance
NZ Mounted Brigade Ambulance

Imperial Mounted Division GOC Colonel (temp. Major General) H. W. Hodgson
3rd Light Horse Brigade GOC Colonel (temp. Brigadier General) J. R. Royston
8th Light Horse Regiment
9th Light Horse Regiment
10th  Light Horse Regiment
3rd Australian Light Horse Signal Troop
3rd Australian Machine Gun Squadron
4th Light Horse Brigade GOC Lieutenant Colonel (temp. Brigadier General) J. B. Meredith
4th Light Horse Regiment
11th Light Horse Regiment
12th Light Horse Regiment
4th Australian Light Horse Signal Troop
4th Australian Machine Gun Squadron
5th Mounted Brigade GOC Colonel (temp. Brigadier General) E. A. Wiggin
1/1st Warwick Yeomanry
1/1st Gloucester Yeomanry
1/1st Worcester Yeomanry
5th Mounted Brigade Signal Troop
16th Machine Gun Squadron
6th Mounted Brigade GOC Lieutenant Colonel (temp. Brigadier General) T. M. S. Pitt
1/1st Buckinghamshire Yeomanry
1/1st Berkshire Yeomanry
1/1st Dorsetshire Yeomanry
6th Brigade Signal Troop
17th Machine Gun Squadron
Divisional Troops
Artillery
1/1st Nottinghamshire and 1/1st Berkshire Batteries RHA
"A" and "B" Batteries, H.A.C.
Mounted Divisional Ammunition Column
Engineers
Imperial Mounted Division Field Squadron
Signal Service
Imperial Mounted Division Signal Squadron
ASC (unidentified)
Medical Units
3rd and 4th Light Horse, 1/1st and 1/2nd South Midland Mounted Brigades Field Ambulances

Northern Canal Section
GOC Colonel (temp. Brigadier General) H. D. Watson commander of 20th Indian Brigade
Mounted Troops
1/2nd County of London Yeomanry (less two squadrons)
16th Company Imperial Camel Corps (attached from 4th Battalion)
Infantry
20th Indian Brigade (attached)
Alwar Infantry (I.S.)
Gwalior Infantry (I.S.)
Patiala Infantry (I.S.)
Signal Section
121st (Indian) Field Ambulance

1st Battalion British West Indies Regiment
2nd Battalion British West Indies Regiment
1st Garrison Battalion, Notts and Derby Regiment (two companies)
19th Garrison Battalion, Rifle Brigade
Medical Units
1/1st Lowland Mounted Brigade Field Ambulance

Delta and Western Force
GOC Brevet Colonel (temp. Brigadier General) H. G. Casson
Mounted Troops
Bikanir Camel Corps
Nos. 8 and 10 Companies Imperial Camel Corps
"B" Squadron 1/2nd County of London Yeomanry (attached Imperial School of Instruction, Zeitoun)
Infantry
2nd Garrison Battalion, Royal Welch Fusiliers
2/7th Battalion, Northumberland Fusiliers
6th Garrison Battalion, Royal Welch Fusiliers
20th Garrison Battalion, Rifle Brigade
21st Garrison Battalion, Rifle Brigade
22nd Garrison Battalion, Rifle Brigade
1st Garrison Battalion, Royal Warwickshire Regiment
1st Garrison Battalion, Devonshire Regiment
1st Garrison Battalion, Royal Irish Regiment
One Company, 3rd Infantry Battalion, Egyptian Army
Artillery
Detachment, Royal Marine Artillery (2 Naval 4-inch guns)
No. 2 Armoured Train
Detachments RFA dismounted (three 15-pdr, Q.F., two 15-pdr BLC, two 15-pdr Ehrhardt and two 9-pdr Krupp guns)
Nos 1, 2, 3 Light Armoured Motor Batteries
Six Light Car Patrols (Ford cars)
Signal Service
Western Force Signal Company
No. 42 Airline Section
UU Cable Section
Pigeon Section (detachment)
No. 6 Wagon and No. 6 Pack W/T Section
ASC
Mechanical transport
5th, 6th, 29th Reserve Field Ambulance and Workshop Units
Western Force Mechanical Transport Supply Company
Advanced M.T. Supply Depot (Samalut)
No. 303 (M.T.) Company ASC
Camel Transport
"H" and "O" Companies, Egyptian Camel Transport Corps

Alexandria District
GOC Colonel (temp. Brigadier General) R. C. Boyle
Coast Defence Artillery
No. 103rd Local Company, RGA
Ras el Tin Fort
Royal Malta Artillery (detachment)
Quarantine and Chatby Batteries
Mex Fort
Infantry
5th [sic probably 3rd] Battalion, British West Indies Regiment
1st Garrison Battalion, Liverpool Regiment
2nd Garrison battalion, Cheshire Regiment

General Headquarters Troops
Royal Flying Corps Middle East Brigade RFC GOC Brevet Lieutenant Colonel (temp. Brigadier General) W. G. H. Salmond
5th Wing
Nos 14 and 67 (Australian) Squadrons
20th Reserve Wing
Nos 21, 22, 23, 57, 58 Reserve Squadrons
Engineers
Railway Operating Division
115th and 116th Railway Companies RE
2 Companies Railway Battalion Sappers and Miners
Topographical Section RE
Signal Service
"M" (L. of C.) Signal Company
Nos 12 and 62 Airline Sections
BQ, BS Cable Sections
Northern Wagon, Southern Motor and No. 12 Pack W/T Sections
ASC
Mechanical transport
HQ, ASC Motor Boat Company
Two Advanced M.T. Sub Depots (Ismailia and Qantara)
52nd Highland Mounted Brigade, 6th Reserve and 29th Field Ambulance and Workshop Units
Camel Transport
Nos 1 and 2 Came Transport Depots
"O" [sic] and "R" Companies, Egyptian Camel Transport Corps

Southern Canal Section
GOC Brevet Colonel (temp. Brigadier General) P. C. Palin in addition to GOC 29th Indian Brigade
Mounted Troops
4th (Australian and New Zealand) Battalion, Imperial Camel Corps (less 15th Coy, attached 3rd Battalion and 16th Coy attached Northern Canal Section with 13th Coy from 3rd Battalion attached)
Engineers
14th Army Troops Company RE
496th (Kent) Field Company (less detachment)
Infantry
232nd Brigade (first brigade of the yet to be formed 75th Division )
2nd Loyal North Lancashire
1/4th Duke of Cornwall's Light Infantry (both temporarily attached to Eastern Force)
1/5th Devonshire Regiment
2/5th Hampshire Regiment
29th Indian Brigade
2/3rd Gurkhas
3/3rd Gurkhas
123rd Rifles
Brigade Signal Section
123rd Indian Field Ambulance
Indian Brigade Supply Column
49th Indian Brigade
58th Rifles
1/101st Grenadiers
1/102nd Grenadiers
110th Indian Field Ambulance

1st Garrison Battalion Notts and Derby Regiment (less two companies)
1st Garrison Battalion, Northampton Regiment
ASC
No. 900 Company ASC (Auxiliary Horse Transport Company, Ismailia)

Cyprus Detachment
1st Garrison Battalion Royal Scots

and Lines of Communications controlled by GHQ including RFC "X" Aircraft Park (5th Wing), "X" Aircraft Depot for all Middle East units RFC, Engineers,  Signal Service, ASC, Medical Units, Ordnance, Veterinary, Remounts and Postal Units.

Expansion of Desert Column June 1917
Desert Column was expanded to three divisions, commanded by Chauvel –
Anzac Mounted Division commanded by Major General Chaytor
1st Light Horse Brigade
2nd Light Horse Brigade
New Zealand Mounted Rifle Brigade
18th Brigade, Royal Horse Artillery (18 pounder guns)

Australian Mounted Division commanded by Major General Hodgson
3rd Light Horse Brigade
4th Light Horse Brigade
5th Mounted Brigade
19th Brigade, Royal Horse Artillery (18 pounder guns)

Yeomanry Mounted Division commanded by Major General G. de S. Barrow
6th Mounted Brigade
8th Mounted Brigade (recently arrived from Salonika)
22nd Mounted Brigade (recently arrived from Salonika)
20th Brigade, Royal Horse Artillery (13 pounder guns)

Army Troops
Imperial Camel Corps Brigade
7th Yeomanry Brigade (two regiments)
an unidentified battery.

At the end of June 1917 General Allenby took command. At that time the Egyptian Expeditionary Force consisted of the British XX Corps and the British XXI Corps, under the command of Lieutenant Generals Philip Chetwode and Edward Stanislaus Bulfin, respectively, along with the Desert Mounted Corps commanded by Lieutenant General Harry Chauvel. The air component was the Palestine Brigade of the Royal Flying Corps (later the Royal Air Force) and the Australian Flying Corps.

Order of Battle October

XX Corps (Lieutenant General Sir R.W. Chetwode, Bart.)
10th (Irish) Division (Major General J.R. Longley)
29th Brigade
30th Brigade
31st Brigade
53rd (Welsh) Division (Major General S.F. Mott)
158th (North Wales) Brigade
159th (Cheshire) Brigade
160th (Welsh Border) Brigade
60th (2/2nd London) Division (Major General J.S.M. Shea)
179th (2/4th London) Brigade
180th (2/5th London) Brigade
181st (2/6th London) Brigade
74th (Yeomanry) Division (Major General E.S. Girdwood)
229th Brigade
230th Brigade
231st Brigade
Corps Cavalry Regiment – 1/2nd County of London Yeomanry
Corps Artillery – 96th Heavy Artillery Group

XXI Corps (Lieutenant General Sir E.S. Bulfin)
52nd (Lowland) Division (Major General J. Hill)
155th (South Scottish) Brigade
156th (Scottish Rifles) Brigade
157th (Highland Light Infantry) Brigade
54th (East Anglian) Division (Major General S.W. Hare)
161st (Essex) Brigade
162nd (East Midland) Brigade
163rd (Norfolk and Suffolk) Brigade
75th Division(Major General P.C. Palin)
232nd Brigade
233rd Brigade
234th Brigade
Corps Cavalry Regiment – Composite Yeomanry Regt.
Corps Artillery  – 97th, 100th, 102nd Heavy Artillery Groups
20th Indian Brigade (Brigadier General H.D. Watson)

Desert Mounted Corps (Lieutenant General Sir H. Chauvel)
Anzac Mounted Division (Major General E.W.C. Chaytor)
1st Light Horse Brigage (Brigadier General C. F. Cox)
1st, 2nd and 3rd Australian Light Horse Regiments
2nd Light Horse Brigade (Brigadier General G. de L. Ryrie)
5th, 6th and 7th Australian Light Horse Regiments
New Zealand Mounted Rifle Brigade (Brigadier General W. Meldrum)
Auckland, Canterbury and Wellington Mounted Rifle Regiments
18th Brigade RHA (Inverness-shire, Ayrshire and Somerset Batteries) of 13–pounder guns and Divisional Ammunition Column
Australian Mounted Division (Major General Henry W. Hodgson)
3rd Light Horse Brigade (Brigadier General L. C. Wilson)
8th, 9th and 10th Australian Light Horse Regiments
4th Light Horse Brigade (Brigadier General W. Grant)
4th, 11th and 12th Australian Light Horse Regiments
5th Mounted Brigade (Brigadier Generals Percy Desmond FitzGerald/P. J. V. Kelly)
Gloucestershire Husssars, Warwickshire and Worcestershire Yeomanry Regiments
19th Brigade RHA (A and B Batteries Honourable Artillery Company and Notts Battery RHA) of 13–pounder guns and Divisional Ammunition Column
Yeomanry Mounted Division (Major General G. de S. Barrow)
6th Mounted Brigade (Brigadier General C. A. C. Godwin)
Dorset, Bucks and Berks Yeomanry Regiments
8th Mounted Brigade (Brigadier General C. S. Rome)
1st City of London and 1st and 3rd County of London Yeomanry Regiments
22nd Mounted Brigade (Brigadier General P. D. FitzGerald)
Stafford, Lincoln and East Riding Yeomanry Regiments
20th Brigade RHA (Berkshire, Hampshire and Leicestershire Batteries) of 13–pounder guns and Divisional Ammunition Column
Corps Reserve
7th Mounted Brigade (Brigadier General J. T. Wigan)
Sherwood Rangers, South Notts and Herts Yeomanry Regiments with the Essex Battery RHA and Brigade Ammunition Column
Imperial Camel Corps Brigade (Brigadier General C. L. Smith)
2nd (British) Battalion
3rd (Australian and New Zealand) Battalion
4th (Australian and New Zealand) Battalion
Hong Kong and Singapore Camel Battery RGA.

On establishment in 1916 and 1917, the first two mounted divisions had been supplied with 18–pounder artillery guns. In September 1917 these guns were replaced with 13-pounders, making the divisions "even more capable", according to Erickson.

General Headquarters Troops
Army Cavalry
Imperial Service Cavalry Brigade (Major (temp. Brigadier General) M. H. Henderson)
Jodhpur Lancers
Mysore Lancers
1st Hyderabad Lancers
Kathiwar Signal Troop
124th Indian Cavalry Field Ambulance.

Royal Flying Corps, Middle East (Brigadier General W. G. H. Salmond to 5 November then Brigadier General W. S. Brancker to 3 January 1918 when Salmond returned)
Palestine Brigade (composite Royal Flying Corps RFC and Australian Flying Corps (AFC) (Lieutenant Colonel A. E. Borton) operational from 27 October to 7 November 1917)
5th (Artillery Corps) Wing at Deir el Belah
No. 14 Squadron RFC at Deir el Belah and allotted to XXI Corps
No. 113 Squadron RFC at Sheikh Nuran (2 flights allotted to XX Corps; 1 flight to Desert Mounted Corps)
No. 21 Kite Balloon Company consisting of –
No. 49 Kite Balloon Section at Sheikh Shabasi
No. 50 Kite Balloon Section at Wadi Ghuzze.
40th (Army) Wing Headquarters at Deir el Belah
No. 11 Squadron RFC at Deir el Belah
No. 67 Squadron (No. 1 Squadron Australian Flying Corps) at Shiekh Nuran. (A special squadron was formed from the 20th Training Wing at Aboukir on 24 October for duty at Nuran under the direct orders of the Palestine Brigade for operations consisting of bombing raids on enemy camps, dumps, trench works and battery positions.)
Aircraft Park – "X" Aircraft Park at Abbassia with an advanced stores section at Kantara was responsible for the supplies to the RFC in Palestine.

Also in General Headquarters Troops were the
VIII Mountain Brigade RGA (10th and 11th Batteries of 3.7inch howitzers)
IX Mountain Brigade RGA of "A" and "B" Batteries of 2.75 inch howitzers and the 12th Battery of 3.7 inch howitzers.

1918
The force initially consisted mostly of British and Egyptian troops, but most of the former were sent to the Western Front in early 1918 to help repel Germany's Spring Offensive.  In the meantime, new troops were then dispatched from India, Australia, and New Zealand, in particular who made up a large portion of the army.  Though it was feared that mostly Muslim Indian troops might desert and join Ottoman Empire forces in the region (who had declared a jihad against the Allies early in the war), this fear proved unfounded, as the Indians fought valiantly on the front lines of most of the army's major engagements. The force also included a small contingent of French and Italian troops. (These were known as the  Détachement Français de Palestine et de Syrie and Distaccamento Italiano di Palestina commanded by Colonel Gilles de Philpin de Piépape & Lieutenant Colonel Francesco D'Agostino respectively.) The forces of the Arab Revolt, led by Prince Feisal of Mecca, were also unofficially attached during Allenby's Damascus offensive.

The force's role evolved from a defense of Egypt to the invasion of Palestine which involved: the capture of Beersheba and Gaza in October–November 1917 (see Third Battle of Gaza), entering Jerusalem on 11 December 1917, and Allenby's successful campaign of 1918, resulting in the defeat of the Turks at Megiddo, and the capture of Damascus, Beirut, and Aleppo. The force's successes ultimately led to Turkey's exit from the war and the creation of the British Mandate of Palestine.

The Palestine Brigade RAF was reorganised at the end of 1917 or during the summer of 1918, as follows:
5th (Corps) Wing
No. 14 Squadron RAF
No. 113 Squadron RAF
No. 142 Squadron RAF

40th (Army) Wing
No. 111 Squadron RAF
No. 144 Squadron RAF
No. 145 Squadron RAF
No. 1 Squadron AFC
No. 21 Balloon Company
Nos 49, 50, 57 Balloon Section

Deployment, 9 February

 General Headquarters at Bir Salem
7th Mounted Brigade at Deir el Belah
Imperial Service Cavalry Brigade at Herbieh
Imperial Camel Brigade at Rafa
20th Indian Brigade at Gaza
 Desert Mounted Corps at Kh. Deiran
Anzac Mounted Division at Richon le Zion (Ayun Kara)
Australian Mounted Division at Deir el Belah
Yeomanry Mounted Division at Deir el Belah
 XX Corps at Mount of Olives
10th (Irish) Division at O99, P.20.d. place not named.
53rd (Welsh) Division at Ram Allah
60th (London) Division at Jerusalem
74th (Yeomanry) Division at Latron
 XXI Corps at Jaffa
52nd (Lowland) Division at Jaffa and Sarona
54th (East Anglian) Division at Wilhelma
75th Division at Ramleh.

Shea's Force March

60th (London) Division
Anzac Mounted Division
Imperial Camel Corps Brigade including the Hong Kong and Singapore Mountain Battery, with four BL 2.75 inch Mountain Guns, (firing 12-pounder shells) :the 10th Heavy Battery Royal Garrison Artillery (RGA)
 one Light Armoured Car Brigade
Army Bridging Train
Desert Mounted Corps Bridging Train and pontoon units.

Order of Battle April

 Desert Mounted Corps (GOC Lieutenant General H. G. Chauvel)
60th (London) Division commanded by Major General John Shea (less the 181st Brigade in reserve on the XXth Corps front)
179th Brigade (Brigadier General FitzJ. M. Edwards)
2/13th London Regiment
2/14th London Regiment
2/15th London Regiment
2/16th London Regiment
180th Brigade (Brigadier General C. F. Watson)
2/17th London Regiment
2/18th London Regiment
2/19th London Regiment
2/20th London Regiment
Artillery 301st, 302nd, 303rd Brigades RFA
20th Indian Brigade (Brigadier General E. R. B. Murray)
Alwar Infantry (I.S.)
Patiala Infantry (I.S.)
Gwalior Infantry (I.S.)
110th Mahratta L. I. Regiment
Anzac Mounted Division (GOC Major General E. W. C. Chaytor)
2nd Light Horse Brigade (Brigadier General G. de L. Ryrie)
5th Light Horse Regiment
6th Light Horse Regiment
7th Light Horse Regiment
New Zealand Mounted Rifles Brigade (Brigiadier General W. Meldrum)
Auckland Mounted Rifles Regiment
Canterbury Mounted Rifles Regiment
Wellington Mounted Rifles Regiment
Divisional Artillery XVIII Brigade RHA (Inverness-shire, Ayrshire and Somerset Batteries)
Australian Mounted Divisions (GOC Major General H. W. Hodgson)
1st Light Horse Brigade (Brigadier General C. F. Cox) (Anzac Mounted Division)
1st Light Horse Regiment
2nd Light Horse Regiment
3rd Light Horse Regiment
3rd Light Horse Brigade (Brigadier General L. C. Wilson)
8th Light Horse Regiment
9th Light Horse Regiment
10th Light Horse Regiment
4th Light Horse Brigade (Brigadier General W. Grant)
4th Light Horse Regiment
11th Light Horse Regiment
12th Light Horse Regiment
5th Mounted Brigade (Brigadier General P. J. V. Kelly)
1/1st Gloucester Yeomanry Regiment
1/1st Worcester Yeomanry Regiment
1/1st Sherwood Rangers Regiment (7th Mounted Yeomanry Brigade)
Divisional Artillery XIX Brigade RHA (Notts. Battery RHA, "A" and "B: Batteries HAC with Hong Kong Mountain Battery attached)
1/1st Dorset Yeomanry Regiment (6th Mounted Yeomanry Brigade)
1/1st County of London (Middlesex) Yeomanry Regiment (8th Mounted Yeomanry Brigade)
Imperial Service Cavalry Brigade
Jodhpur Lancers
Mysore Lancers
Hyderabad Lancers
11th and 12th Light Armoured Motor Batteries [LAMB] (Machine Gun Corps)
West of the Jordan
Imperial Camel Corps Brigade (Brigadier General C. L. Smith)
2nd (British) Battalion
3rd (Australian) Battalion
4th (ANZAC) Battalion
Artillery Singapore Mountain Battery less Hong Kong Mountain Battery
22nd Mounted Brigade (Brigadier General F. A. B. Fryer/Brigadier General P. D. FitzGerald)
1/1st Lincolnshire Yeomanry Regiment
1/1st Staffordshire Yeomanry Regiment
1/1st East Riding Yeomanry Regiment

Order of Battle 19 September

XX Corps (Lieutenant General Sir P. Chetwode)
53rd (Welsh) Division (Major General S. F. Mott)
158th Brigade (Brigadier General H. A. Vernon)
5/6th R. Welsh Fus., 4/11th Gurkhas, 3/153rd and 154th Indian Inf.
159th Brigade (Brigadier General N. Money)
4/5th Welsh Regt., 3/152nd, 1/153rd and 2/153rd Indian Inf.
160th Brigade (Brigadier General V. L. N. Pearson)
1/7th R. Welsh Fus., 1/17th Indian Inf., 1/21st Punjabis, 1st Cape Corps
265th, 266th, 267th Brigades RFA each with three batteries of twelve 18-pdrs. and four 4.5-inch hows.
39th Indian Mountain Battery
Troop Corps Cavalry Regiment (1/1st Worcester Yeomanry)
10th (Irish) Division (Major General J. R. Longley)
29th Brigade (Brigadier General C.L. Smith)
1st Leinsters, 1/101st Grenadiers, 1/54th Sikhs, 2/151st Infantry
30th Brigade (Brigadier General F. A. Greer)
1st Royal Irish Regt., 1st Kashmir I.S. Rifles, 38th Dogras, 46th Punjabis
31st Brigade (Brigadier General E. M. Morris)
2nd Royal Irish Fus., 2/101st Grenadiers, 74th Punjabis, 2/42nd Deolis
67th, 68th, 263rd Brigades RFA (67th and 68th Brigades with three batteries of twelve 18-pdrs. and four 4.5-inch hows.; 263rd Brigade with six 18-pdrs. and four 4.5-inch hows.)
Hong Kong and Singapore Mountain Battery
"Watson's Force" (holding centre of XX Corps' Front)
Corps Cavalry Regiment (1/1 Worcester Yeomanry)
Pioneer Battalions (2/155th and 1/155th) of 10th and 53rd Divisions
Corps Reinforcement Detachment (700 strong)
XX Corps Heavy Artillery
 For support of 53rd Division
103rd Brigade RGA
R. Section 10th Heavy Battery
L. Section 10th Heavy Battery
205th Siege Battery
387th Siege Battery (less 1 gun)
392nd  Siege Battery
 For support of 10th Division
421st Siege Battery
397th Siege Battery (1 gun)
2 captured 15 cm hows.
2 captured 105 mm hows
3 captured 75 mm hows.

XXI Corps (Lieutenant General Sir E. Bulfin)
3rd (Lahore) Division (Major General A.R. Hoskins)
7th Brigade (Brigadier General S. R. Davidson)
1st Connaught Rngrs, 2/7th Gurkha Rifles, 27th and 91st Punjabis
8th Brigade (Brigadier General S. M. Edwardes)
1st Manchester Regt., 27th Sikhs, 59th Scinde Rifles, 2/124th Baluchistan Infantry
9th Brigade (Brigadier General C. C. Luard)
2nd Dorsets, 1/1st Gurkha Rifles, 93rd Infantry, 105th Mahratta Light Infantry
4th, 8th, 53rd Brigades RFA, each with twelve 18-pdrs. and four 4.5-inch hows.
7th (Meerut) Division (Major General Sir V. B. Fane)
19th Brigade (Brigadier General G. S. Weir)
1st Seaforth Highrs., 28th and 92nd Punjabis, 125th Napier's Rifles
21st Brigade (Brigadier General A. G. Kemball)
2nd Black Watch, 1st Guides Infantry, 20th Punjabis, 1/8th Gurkha Rifles
28th Brigade (Brigadier General C. H Davies)
2nd Leicesters, 51st and 53rd Sikhs, 56th Punjabi Rifles
261st, 262nd, 264th Brigades RFA, each with twelve 18-pds and four 4.5-inch hows.
54th (East Anglian) Division (Major General S. W. Hare)
161st (Essex) Brigade (Brigadier General A. B. Orpen Palmer)
1/4th, 1/5th, 1/6th and 1/7th Essex
162nd (East Midland) Brigade (Brigadier General A. Mudge)
1/5th Bedford, 1/4th Nothampton, 1/10th and 1/11th London
163rd (Norfolk and Suffolk) Brigade (Brigadier General A. J. MacNeill)
1/4th, 1/5th Norfolk, 1/5th Suffolk, 1/8th Hampshire
270th, 271st, 272nd Brigades RFA, each with twelve 18-pds and four 4.5-inch hows.
60th (London) Division (Major General Sir J. S. M. Shea)
179th Brigade (Brigadier General E. T. Humphreys)
2/13th London, 3/151st Infantry, 2/19th Punjabis, 2/137th Baluchis
180th Brigade (Brigadier General C. F. Watson)
2/19th London, 2nd Guides, 2/30th Punjabis, 1/50th Kumoan Rifles
181st Brigade (Brigadier General E. C. da Costa)
2/22nd London, 130th Baluchis, 2/97th Deccan Inf., 2/152nd Infantry.
75th Division (Major General P. C. Palin)
232nd Brigade (Brigadier General H. J. Huddleston)
1/4th Wilts, 72nd Punjabis, 2/3rd Gurkhas, 3rd Kashmir I.S. Infantry
233rd Brigade (Brigadier General E. M. Colston)
1/5th Somerset Light Infantry, 29th Punjabis, 3/3rd Gurkhas, 2/154th Infantry
234th Brigade (Brigadier General C. A. H. Maclean)
1/4th D.C.L.I., 123rd Outram Rifles, 58th Vaughan's Rifles, 1/152nd Infantry.
301st, 302nd 303rd Brigades RFA, each with twelve 18-pdrs. and four 4.5- hows.
Corps mounted troops (Composite Yeomanry Regiment)
5th Light Horse Brigade (under orders of 60th Division)
French Palestine Contingent (4 Bns and 3 Btys)
 See also Battle of Arara#Deployment of 54th Division and DFPS
XXI Corps Heavy Artillery
 Sub-Group under the Right Group
4.7-inch Battery RGA
300 SB, RGA 6-inch Section
334 SB, RGA, One Section
 Right Group
100th Brigade, RGA, Headquarters –
15th HB, RGA
134 SB, RGA
334 SB, RGA One Section
43 SB, RGA "Bessie"
 Right Centre Group
95th Brigade, RGA Headquarters –
181 HB, RGA
304 SB, RGA
314 SB, RGA
383 SB, RGA
422 SB, RGA
5.9-inch Hows. Section.
 Left Centre Group
102nd Brigade, RGA Headquarters –
91 HB, RGA
209 SB, RGA
380 SB, RGA
440 SB, RGA
300 SB, RGA 8 inch Section
43 SB, RGA "Lizzie"
 Left Group
96th Brigade, RGA Headquarters –
189 HB, RGA
202 HB, RGA
378 SB, RGA
394 SB, RGA
Generally –
 The Sub-Group was in support of the French
 The Right Group was in support of the 54th Division
 The Right Centre Group was in support of the 3rd (Lahore) Division
 The Left Centre Group was in support of the 75th Division
 The Left Group was in support of the 60th Division.

Desert Mounted Corps (Lieutenant General Sir H. Chauvel)
4th Cavalry Division (Major General Sir G. de S. Barrow)
10th Cavalry Brigade (Brigadier General Wilfrith Gerald Key Green/Richard Howard-Vyse)
1/1 Dorset Yeomanry (ex 6th Mounted Brigade), 2nd Lancers, 38th Central India Horse (38th King George's Own Central India Horse)
11th Cavalry Brigade (Brigadier General Charles Levinge Gregory)
1/1st County of London Yeomanry (ex 8th Mounted Brigade), 29th Lancers, 36th Jacob's Horse
12th Cavalry Brigade (Brigadier General J. T. Wigan)
1/1Stafford Yeomanry (ex 22nd Mounted Brigade), 6th Cavalry, 19th Lancers
20th Brigade RHA and Divisional Ammunition Column
12th LAM Battery
No. 7 Light Car Patrol
5th Cavalry Division (Major General H. J. M. MacAndrew)
13th Cavalry Brigade (Brigadier General Philip James Vandeleur Kelly)
1/1 Gloucester Yeomanry (ex 5th Mounted Brigade), 9th Hodson's Horse, 18th Lancers
14th Cavalry Brigade (Brigadier General Goland Vanhalt Clarke)
1/1 Sherwood Rangers Yeomanry (ex 7th Mounted Brigade), 20th Deccan Horse, 34th Poona Horse
15th (Imperial Service) Cavalry Brigade (Brigadier General Cyril Rodney Harbord)
Jodhpur, Mysore and 1st Hyderabad Lancers [Regiments] (These regiments were all maintained by the Ruling Princes of their respective States in India.)
'B' Battery HAC and Essex Battery RHA with Divisional Ammunition Column
11th LAM Battery
No. 1 Light Car Patrol.
Australian Mounted Division (Major General H. W. Hodgson)
3rd Light Horse Brigade (Brigadier General L. C. Wilson)
8th, 9th, 10th Australian Light Horse Regiments
4th Light Horse Brigade (Brigadier General W. Grant)
4th, 11th 12th Light Horse Regiments
5th Light Horse Brigade (Brigadier General C. Macarthur Onslow) (attached XXI Corps till 22 September)
14th, 15th Light Horse Regiments (ex Imperial Camel Corps Brigade)
1er Régiment Mixte de Marche de Cavalerie du Levant
French Chasseurs d'Afrique (2 squadrons)
Spahis (1 squadron).
19th Brigade RHA.

Chaytor's Force (Major General E.W.C. Chaytor)
20th Indian Brigade
Four Indian Battalions
38th Battalion Royal Fusiliers (Jewish Battalion)
39th Battalion Royal Fusiliers (Jewish Battalion)
Anzac Mounted Division (Major General E.W.C. Chaytor)
1st Light Horse Brigage (Brigadier General C. F. Cox)
1st, 2nd and 3rd Light Horse Regiments
1st Battalion British West Indies Regiment
2nd Light Horse Brigade (Brigadier General G. de L. Ryrie)
5th, 6th and 7th Light Horse Regiments
New Zealand Mounted Rifle Brigade (Brigadier General W. Meldrum)
Auckland, Canterbury and Wellington Mounted Rifle Regiments
2nd Battalion British West Indies Regiment
18th Brigade RHA (Inverness-shire, Ayrshire and Somerset Batteries) and Divisional Ammunition Column
A/263 Battery RFA
195th Heavy Battery RGA
29th and 32nd Indian Mountain Batteries
No. 6 (Medium) Trench Mortar Battery
3 anti–aircraft sections RA
Detachment No. 35 AT Company RE.

See also
 Sinai and Palestine Campaign
 History of Palestine
 Postage stamps and postal history of Palestine

Notes

References

Bibliography

 
 
 
 
 
 
 
 
 
 
 
 
 
 
 
 
 
 
 

Expeditionary units and formations
Commands of the British Army
Egypt
Egypt
Military units and formations of the British Army in World War I
Egypt in World War I
Middle Eastern theatre of World War I
World War I orders of battle
Military units and formations established in 1916
Military units and formations disestablished in 1919